Rauhocereus is a genus of cacti (family Cactaceae) with nocturnal flowers. It is known from northern Peru (Rio Santa, Rio Zana, Chamaya and Jaén).

References 

Trichocereeae
Cacti of South America
Endemic flora of Peru
Cactoideae genera